The Elder Museum of Science and Technology (Spanish: Museo Elder de la Ciencia y la Tecnología) is a museum in Las Palmas, the capital city of Gran Canaria in the Canary Islands.

History
The museum takes its name from the shipping company Elder Dempster Lines, the original owners of the building in which the museum is now housed. Elder Dempster Lines was founded in 1878 by two Scottish shipping entrepreneurs, 
Alexander Elder (brother of the shipbuilder John Elder) and John Dempster, and the company used to transport bananas from Gran Canaria to Britain. The Elder Museum took over the building and opened to the public in December 1999.

Collections

The museum display are on four floors, with exhibitions of technology, physics, mathematics, geology , biology, medicine and astronomy, with a digital planetarium.  Among the items on display are models of steamships and a marine diesel engine, a Northrop F-5 fighter jet plane, a greenhouse ecosystem and a "Robocoaster". A steam locomotive dating from 1885 is displayed near the cafeteria. In 2017 the museum unveiled a scale model of the European Solar Telescope which is planned to be built on La Palma. A new Science and Research room was also opened in 2017.

The museum encourages hands-on interaction with the displays, and notices around the galleries humorously state that it is forbidden not to touch the exhibits.

References

External links

Buildings and structures in Las Palmas
Tourist attractions in Las Palmas
Museums in the Canary Islands
Museums established in 1999
Science museums in Spain
Technology museums in Spain
Science and technology in Gran Canaria
1999 establishments in Spain